Thomas Coke (pronounced Cook) may refer to:

Thomas Coke (MP for Winchester), see Winchester
Thomas Coke (MP for Salisbury) (died 1523)
Thomas Coke (privy counsellor) (1674–1727), of Melbourne Hall, Derbyshire, created Privy Counsellor in 1708
Thomas Coke (bishop) (1747–1814), early Methodist
Thomas Coke, 1st Earl of Leicester (fifth creation) (1697–1759), English land-owner, Member of Parliament and patron of the arts
Thomas Coke, 1st Earl of Leicester (seventh creation) (1754–1842), agricultural innovator, created 1st Earl of Leicester of Holkham
 Thomas Coke (MP for Leicester) (died 1656), English politician who sat in the House of Commons from 1640 to 1645
 Thomas Coke, 2nd Earl of Leicester (1822–1909), British peer
 Thomas Coke, 3rd Earl of Leicester (1848–1941), British peer and soldier
 Thomas Coke, 4th Earl of Leicester (1880–1949), British peer
 Thomas Coke, 5th Earl of Leicester (1908–1976), British peer
 Thomas Coke, 8th Earl of Leicester (born 1965), British peer
 Thomas Coke (seneschal of Gascony), 14th-century English noble

See also
Thomas Cooke (disambiguation)
Earl of Leicester